USS Kalk was the name of several American vessels. It may refer to:

, was a  laid down as Rodgers on 4 March 1917; renamed Kalk 23 December 1918; transferred to the Royal Navy 23 September 1940; transferred to the Royal Canadian Navy in June 1941 and finally scrapped in 1945
 was renamed Rogers 23 December 1918
, was a  laid down 30 June 1941 and 	sunk as a target in March 1969

United States Navy ship names